1989 Empress's Cup Final was the 11th final of the Empress's Cup competition. The final was played at National Stadium in Tokyo on March 25, 1990. Takatsuki FC won the championship.

Overview
Takatsuki FC won their 1st title, by defeating Shimizu FC Ladies 1–0.

Match details

See also
1989 Empress's Cup

References

Empress's Cup
1989 in Japanese women's football